The 2019 Evian Championship was played 25–28 July at the Evian Resort Golf Club in Évian-les-Bains, France. It was the 26th Evian Championship (the first 20 played as the Evian Masters), and the seventh as a major championship on the LPGA Tour. The event was televised by Golf Channel and NBC Sports in the United States and Sky Sports in the United Kingdom.

Ko Jin-young won her second major of the year by two strokes over Shanshan Feng and Kim Hyo-joo. Earlier in the year, she won the 2019 ANA Inspiration.

Field
The field for the tournament was set at 120, and most earned exemptions based on past performance on the Ladies European Tour, the LPGA Tour, or with a high ranking in the Women's World Golf Rankings.

There were 17 exemption categories for the 2019 Evian Championship.

1. Evian invitations (four)

María Fassi, Julie McCarthy (a), Yealimi Noh, Albane Valenzuela (a)

2. Top two from the Jabra Ladies Open

Annabel Dimmock (10), Pauline Roussin-Bouchard (a)

3. Top two players from the Island Resort Championship on the Symetra Tour

Cindy Ha, Daniela Iacobelli

4. Winner of the Hanwha Classic Evian Championship Asia Challenge

Ahn Shi-hyun

5. The top 40 in the Women's World Golf Rankings, as of 25 June 2019

Marina Alex, Choi Hye-jin, Chun In-gee (6,8,9), Carlota Ciganda, Austin Ernst (12), Shanshan Feng (9), Hannah Green (8,9), Georgia Hall (8), Nasa Hataoka (9), Brooke Henderson (8,9,12), Mamiko Higa, Charley Hull (10), Ji Eun-hee (9), Ariya Jutanugarn (8), Moriya Jutanugarn, Danielle Kang (8,9), Kim Hyo-joo (6), In-Kyung Kim (8), Kim Sei-young (9,12), Ko Jin-young (8,9), Lydia Ko (6,8,12), Jessica Korda (12), Nelly Korda (9), Bronte Law (9), Lee Jeong-eun (8,9,12), Lee Mi-hyang (12), Minjee Lee (9), Yu Liu, Azahara Muñoz, Inbee Park (7,8,12), Park Sung-hyun (8,9), Ryu So-yeon (8,12), Lizette Salas, Ai Suzuki, Lexi Thompson (9), Amy Yang (9), Angel Yin

Ahn Sun-ju, Bae Seon-woo, and Jiyai Shin (7) did not play.

6. Past Evian Championship winners

Anna Nordqvist, Angela Stanford (12)

Suzann Pettersen did not play.

7. Active Evian Masters Champions (must have played in 10 LPGA Tour or LET events from 25 July 2018 to 25 July 2019)

Paula Creamer, Laura Davies

Karrie Webb did not play.

8. Winners of the other women's majors for the last five years

Brittany Lang, Pernilla Lindberg

Brittany Lincicome did not play.

9. LPGA Tour winners since the 2018 Evian

Céline Boutier, Gaby López, Thidapa Suwannapura

Cydney Clanton did not play.

10. LET winners since the 2018 Evian

Diksha Dagar, Céline Herbin, Nuria Iturrioz (11), Meghan MacLaren (11), Becky Morgan, Marianne Skarpnord (11), Anne Van Dam

Atthaya Thitikul (a) did not play.

11. The top five on the LET Order of Merit, as of 16 July

Caroline Hedwall, Esther Henseleit

12. Top 10 and ties from the 2018 Evian Championship

Katherine Kirk, Amy Olson, Ryann O'Toole

Mo Martin did not play.

13. 2018 U.S. Women's Amateur champion

Kristen Gillman forfeited her exemption by turning professional in November 2018. She qualified under category 17.

14. 2019 British Ladies Amateur champion

Emily Toy (a)

15. 2019 Women's Asia Pacific Championship champion

Yuka Yasuda (a)

16. Any player who qualified for the 2018 Evian but did not compete due to maternity

Stacy Lewis

17. LPGA Tour money list, as of 16 July (if needed to fill the field to 120)

Brittany Altomare, Pajaree Anannarukarn, Aditi Ashok, Nicole Broch Larsen, Ashleigh Buhai, Tiffany Chan, Chella Choi, Daniela Darquea, Lindy Duncan, Dana Finkelstein, Sandra Gal, Kristen Gillman, Jaye Marie Green, Mina Harigae, Wei-Ling Hsu, M. J. Hur, Tiffany Joh, Haeji Kang, Sarah Kemp, Cristie Kerr, Megan Khang, Jennifer Kupcho, Lee Jeong-eun, Mirim Lee,  Lin Xiyu, Nanna Koerstz Madsen, Caroline Masson, Ally McDonald, Su-Hyun Oh, Annie Park, Pornanong Phatlum, Gerina Piller, Morgan Pressel, Melissa Reid, Madelene Sagström, Sarah Schmelzel, Alena Sharp, Jenny Shin, Jennifer Song, Mariah Stackhouse, Lauren Stephenson, Linnea Strom, Emma Talley, Charlotte Thomas, Maria Torres, Ayako Uehara, Mariajo Uribe, Jing Yan, Sakura Yokomine, Pavarisa Yoktuan

Jodi Ewart Shadoff and Haru Nomura did not play.

Nationalities in the field

Past champions in the field

Made the cut

Missed the cut

Course

Source:

Round summaries

First round
Thursday, 25 July 2019

Paula Creamer shot a 7-under-par 64 to lead by one stroke over four golfers. Defending champion Angela Stanford shot a 5-over 76.

Second round
Friday, 26 July 2019

Lee Mi-hyang shot a second round 67 to take a one-stroke lead over three fellow South Koreans. The round was interrupted by a weather delay in the late afternoon. First round leader Paula Creamer fell seven strokes in her first five holes after the delay and ended with a 76 to fall to −2 and T-24 for the tournament. Defending champion Angela Stanford missed the cut by six strokes.

Third round
Saturday, 27 July 2019

Final round
Sunday, 28 July 2019

Scorecard

Cumulative tournament scores, relative to par
{|class="wikitable" span = 50 style="font-size:85%;"
|-
|style="background: Red;" width=10|
|Eagle
|style="background: Pink;" width=10|
|Birdie
|style="background: PaleGreen;" width=10|
|Bogey
|style="background: Green;" width=10|
|Double bogey
|style="background: Olive;" width=10|
|Triple bogey+
|}

References

External links

Coverage on the Ladies European Tour's official site
Coverage on the LPGA Tour's official site

The Evian Championship
Golf tournaments in France
Evian Championship
Evian Championship
Evian Championship